Signal Hill Mall is a regional enclosed shopping mall located in Statesville, North Carolina, serving the Iredell County and the surrounding area located in the northern Charlotte suburbs. It has three stores, anchored by Belk. The mall is located on Interstate 77.

History
C&J Associates announced the mall in 1972, with F. W. Woolworth Company and Belk as the first two anchor stores announced. The third original anchor, Spainhour's, was a local department store also operational in downtown at the time. Belk had been operational in the city since 1912. The mall opened on August 1, 1973.

Hills Stores Company opened a  store at Signal Hill Mall in 1995.

Saslow Jewelers closed its store in 2017.
Radio Shack also closed in 2017. Sears closed in 2012. JCPenney closed in April 2015.

The three stores left in the mall are Belk, Wooten Jewelers, and Stars Wireless.

References

Shopping malls in North Carolina
Iredell County, North Carolina
Shopping malls established in 1973